Cluny–La Sorbonne is a station on Line 10 of the Paris Métro. Located in the 5th arrondissement, it serves the Latin Quarter on the Rive Gauche. The station is connected to the Saint-Michel–Notre-Dame on RER B and RER C. In 2013, the station was used by 2,509,657 passengers, making it the 219th busiest out of 302 on the Métro network.

History
The station was opened as Cluny on 15 February 1930 with the extension of Line 10 from Odéon to Place d'Italie (now on Line 7). This station was closed between 2 September 1939 and 15 December 1988, when it reopened to connect with the new Saint-Michel–Notre-Dame RER station and give access to Boulevard Saint-Germain. The station is named after the Hôtel de Cluny and the Sorbonne. Its original name was simply Cluny; it adopted its current name upon reopening in 1988.

This station is unusual on the Métro network for having a third, centre track that is not used in revenue service. This track is used in non-revenue service to connect the tracks of Line 4 and Line 10.

Places of interest
The Hôtel de Cluny was once the town house of the abbots of Cluny and is now the Musée de Cluny, an important museum containing a variety of artifacts from the Middle Ages. The Hôtel de Cluny is partly constructed on impressive remains of Gallo-Roman baths dating from the 3rd century (known as the Thermes de Cluny) and may still be visited.

The Collège de Sorbonne (founded in 1257) was a constituent of the University of Paris although, at least in the 20th century, the term Sorbonne has been applied to the whole of the University. The university was broken up in 1970 into thirteen universities. Three of them contain 'Sorbonne' in their names (University of Paris 1 Pantheon-Sorbonne, University of Sorbonne Nouvelle Paris 3 and Paris-Sorbonne University) and are nearby.

The Collège de France (founded 1530), a higher research establishment, is also nearby.

Station layout

Gallery

References

Roland, Gérard (2003). Stations de métro. D’Abbesses à Wagram. Éditions Bonneton.

Paris Métro stations in the 5th arrondissement of Paris
Paris Métro stations in the 6th arrondissement of Paris
Railway stations in France opened in 1930